Mohammad Bilal Asif (born 24 September 1985) is a Pakistani cricketer who represents the national team as well a singer-songwriter. 

In August 2018, he was one of thirty-three players to be awarded a central contract for the 2018–19 season by the Pakistan Cricket Board (PCB).

Personal life 
The son of an electrician father based in Kuwait, and the nephew of domestic left-arm seamer Zahid Saeed, Bilal Asif roots are from the Allo Mahar Sharif village, on the outskirts of Daska and close to Sialkot, while in terms of education, he has a degree in arts and is himself fond of singing.

Cricket career

Domestic career
Asif holds the record for scoring the most runs on debut in a Twenty20 match, with 114.

In April 2018, he was named in Sindh's squad for the 2018 Pakistan Cup. He was the joint-leading wicket-taker for Sindh during the tournament, with six dismissals in four matches. In March 2019, he was named in Federal Areas' squad for the 2019 Pakistan Cup.

In September 2019, he was named in Central Punjab's squad for the 2019–20 Quaid-e-Azam Trophy tournament. In January 2021, he was named in Central Punjab's squad for the 2020–21 Pakistan Cup.

International career
He was named in Pakistan's One Day International (ODI) squad for their tour of Sri Lanka in July 2015, although he did not play. He made his ODI debut for Pakistan against Zimbabwe on 3 October 2015.

In his second ODI against Zimbabwe on 5 October 2015, Bilal took his first international five-wicket haul. Zimbabwe were all out for 161 runs and Bilal had figures of 5 for 25. He also hit 38 off 39 deliveries later on, while opening the batting. However, after the match he was reported for a suspect bowling action. He was recalled to Pakistan's Test squad on 19 October for the tour against England, after undergoing an evaluation on his bowling action. His action was cleared by the ICC on 30 October 2015.

In September 2017, he was named in Pakistan's Test squad for their series against Sri Lanka, but he did not play. In September 2018, he was named in Pakistan's Test squad for their series against Australia. He made his Test debut for Pakistan against Australia on 7 October 2018. He became the 11th bowler for Pakistan to take a five-wicket haul on debut in Tests.

In June 2020, he was named as one of four reserve players for Pakistan's tour to England during the COVID-19 pandemic.

Music career
In 2020 he launched his career as a singer-songwriter with the release of the Punjabi track Akhiyan.

In 2021 he wrote and sung Yeh Hai PSL, an unofficial anthem for the Pakistan Super League.

References

External links
 

1985 births
Living people
Punjabi people
Pakistani cricketers
Pakistan Test cricketers
Pakistan One Day International cricketers
Sialkot cricketers
Quetta Gladiators cricketers
Lahore Qalandars cricketers
Sialkot Stallions cricketers
Cricketers from Sialkot
Cricketers who have taken five wickets on Test debut
Central Punjab cricketers
Pakistani male singer-songwriters
Punjabi-language singers